Murphy's War is an Eastmancolor 1971 Panavision war film starring Peter O'Toole and Siân Phillips. It was directed by Peter Yates based on the 1969 novel by Max Catto. The film's cinematographer was Douglas Slocombe.

The film is set in South America during World War II and focuses on a stubborn survivor of a sunken merchant ship who is consumed in his quest for revenge and retribution against the German submarine that sank his ship.

Plot
In the closing days of World War II, Irish crewman Murphy is the sole survivor of the crew of merchant ship Mount Kyle, which had been sunk by a German U-boat and the survivors machine-gunned in the water. Murphy reaches the shore and finds a missionary settlement on the Orinoco in Venezuela, where he is treated by the pacifist Quaker Dr. Hayden.

When Murphy discovers that the U-boat is hiding farther up river under the cover of the jungle, he obsessively plots to sink it by any means, including by using a surviving Grumman J2F Duck floatplane from the Mount Kyle. The floatplane's wounded pilot was shot dead in his hospital bed by the U-boat captain in order to preserve the secret of the sub's location and of the war crimes committed by the shooting of survivors in the water.

Murphy tries to fly the aircraft on the choppy river water and learns how to manipulate the controls by trial and error. He soon finds the U-boat's hiding place and attempts to bomb it using homemade Molotov cocktail bombs, but his effort fails and the mission settlement is destroyed in retaliation. Later, word comes that Germany has surrendered, but Murphy is obsessed with revenge and plans to ram the U-boat with a floating crane owned by Louis, a friendly Frenchman. This attempt also fails when the U-boat dives under him. However, the submerged U-boat is ensnared in a mud bank. Murphy uses the crane to recover an unexploded torpedo fired earlier by the U-boat and drops it on the trapped crew, killing them. Murphy is also killed as the explosion from the torpedo causes the crane jib to pin him to the deck as the floating crane sinks to the river bed.

Cast
 Peter O'Toole as Murphy 
 Siân Phillips as Dr. Hayden 
 Philippe Noiret as Louis Brezon 
 Horst Janson as Commander Lauchs, German Submarine Captain 
 John Hallam as Lieutenant Ellis, Seaplane Pilot from RNMS Mount Kyle 
 Ingo Mogendorf as Lieutenant Voght, Submarine Executive Officer
 Harry Fielder as German Sub Crewman
 George Roubicek as U-boat Crewman

Differences between film and book

 Murphy is one of his ship's officers in the novel, but his film counterpart is a mechanic for the seaplane.
 The character of Lieutenant Ellis is not featured in the novel.
 Dr. Hayden is a composite of several doctors from the novel.
 Louis is a self-loathing deserter from the French military in the book but a jovial company man in the film.
 The submarine crew is portrayed more sympathetically in the novel. Most of them are war-weary and apolitical, save for Lieutenant Voght, who seizes command and murders Murphy's crew while the captain is incapacitated by a head wound.
 The book's end is quite different to that of the film. In the book, when Murphy drops the torpedo, it splits the sub in half and inadvertently allows most of the trapped crewmen to swim to the surface and survive. An injured Vought cannot reach shore and is carried away by the current to his death. Murphy also avoids death during the crane operation. Murphy and Captain Lauchs briefly fight each other on the beach before sinking to the ground in exhaustion.

Production
In 1969, Frank Sinatra was recruited to star in the film, but he withdrew from the project. Paramount Pictures agreed to provide half of film's financing in exchange for world-distribution rights. The other half of the budget came from London Screenplays, a finance company.

Michael Deeley has said that he and Peter Yates declined the chance to produce The Godfather (1972) in order to make Murphy's War. Yates said that he was particularly interested in "the way in which three people—Murphy, a doctor and a Frenchman left in the backwash of war—are really brought together by circumstance and how each character plays on the other and makes them do things that they wish they hadn't and things they sometimes feel proud of."

Siân Phillips, who plays Dr. Hayden, was appearing opposite her husband Peter O'Toole. The couple had appeared together in the 1964 film Becket and the 1969 musical film Goodbye, Mr. Chips.

Filming began on 23 February 1970 and was completed with location shooting in Malta on 5 July. Filming occurred at locations in the regions of Puerto Ordaz and Castillos de Guayana on the Orinoco River in Venezuela, and on set at Pinewood Studios, Iver Heath and Twickenham Film Studios, Middlesex, England. Deeley described the shoot as the toughest of his career, which led to the breakup of his partnership with Yates, with whom he had made several films.

For the scenes filmed in Malta that depict the burning of the merchant ship, O'Toole swam through water afire with oil and with explosives detonating all around him. He later said: "I used to do all my own stunts when I first started. I made it a principle. Everything in Lawrence of Arabia I did myself. But after suffering a paralyzed hand, a bad back, broken ankle and countless knocks, I decided never again. It was stupid. Films employ stunt men (for a reason!). They can do these things far better than I. I refused to do any more stunts. [Then] I thought, well, just one more time. So I talked myself into it. In Venezuela I even fly a seaplane. If you want to see a picture of sheer terror have a look at the shots of me when I first fly that seaplane."

Several of the sequences were photographed by cinematographer Douglas Slocombe, including the scenes with Murphy piloting the floatplane and the visuals along the Orinoco River. Especially notable is an airborne shot of a flock of scarlet ibises in flight along the shore of the river during the closing credits. For the extensive flying scene with many shots of the floatplane stalling and veering sharply to avoid obstacles, a camera was strapped to the wing of the aircraft.

Several Peace Corps volunteers serving in towns near the Orinoco River were recruited to play Nazi submariners. The volunteers donated their daily wages to the Venezuelan school districts or other organizations with which they were working. 

The Type IX U-boat was represented by the Venezuelan Navy's ARV Carite (S-11); this was the former , which had been sold to Venezuela in 1960. The floating crane was a former World War II tank landing craft. The OA-12 Duck used in the film was restored and flown by Frank Tallman and is on display at the National Museum of the United States Air Force at Wright-Patterson Air Force Base in Dayton, Ohio. In the original book, the aircraft was a Fairey Swordfish.

Release
The film had its world premiere on 13 January 1971 at the Odeon Leicester Square.

Reception
Murphy's War was not successful among critics or at the box office.

Roger Greenspun's review in The New York Times centered on the awkwardness of the plot: "The sense of a film in which nothing quite works with anything else pervades 'Murphy's War,' and it extends from such crucial technical details as the sloppy and finally tedious cross-cutting between things (the seaplane, the motor barge, etc.) and the people who are supposed to be operating them, to the playing together of the principal actors."

A review in Variety stated: "By no means a film classic, 'Murphy's War' stands out as the kind of good, solid entertainment needed these days to fill houses."

Gene Siskel of the Chicago Tribune awarded the film two stars out of four and called it "an adventure story high in production values but low in suspense."

Charles Champlin of the Los Angeles Times wrote: "The story proceeds from the detestable to the improbable by way of the uninteresting. Rarely will you see a major motion picture so flat and devoid of tone or atmosphere. O'Toole's performance is all flash mannerisms and unintelligibly gargled accents."

Gary Arnold of The Washington Post called the film "a dim, self-defeating adventure movie" with a screenplay "at peculiar cross-purposes with itself ... when the German surrender is announced, the script turns on feisty, vengeful sailor Murphy. All of a sudden it's about the madness of the plan to sink the sub, which, unfortunately, happens to be the raison d'etre of the movie."

A review in the New York Daily News praised O'Toole's performance but called the film a "sluggish action spectacle."

References

Notes

Bibliography

 Deeley, Michael. Blade Runners, Deer Hunters and Blowing the Bloody Doors Off: My Life in Cult Movies. New York: Pegasus Books, 2011. .
 Freedland, Michael. Peter O'Toole: A Biography. New York: St. Martin's Press, 1985. .
 Wapshott, Nicholas. Peter O'Toole: A Biography. New York: Beaufort Books, 1984. .

External links
 
 
 
 
 

1971 films
1970s war adventure films
British war adventure films
British aviation films
1970s English-language films
British films about revenge
World War II submarine films
Films based on British novels
Films directed by Peter Yates
Films set in Venezuela
Films shot in Venezuela
Films scored by John Barry (composer)
U-boat fiction
Films with screenplays by Stirling Silliphant
Films scored by Ken Thorne
1970s British films